The Vidor Independent School District is a public school district  based in Vidor, Texas, United States. The district serves a  area in northwestern Orange County and a small portion of far southwestern Jasper County, including the cities of Vidor, Rose City, and Pine Forest. The Jasper County portion has  while the remainder is in Orange County.

In 2009, the school district was rated "recognized" by the Texas Education Agency.

History
The Vidor Rural School District was formed in 1929 through the consolidation of four common school districts – Doty, Magnolia Grove, Pine Forest, and Terry. The Vidor Rural School District became the Vidor Independent School District in 1949.

Schools
Vidor High School (Grades 5,9–12)
AIMs Center High School (Alternative, Grades 9–12)
Vidor Junior High School (Grades 6–8)
Pine Forest Elementary School (Grades PK–4)
Vidor Elementary School (Grades PK–4)
Oak Forest Elementary School (Grades PK-4)

Notable alumni
Tracy Byrd - Country music artist
Dean Corll - Serial killer
Clay Walker - Country music artist.

See also
List of school districts in Texas

References

External links
Vidor ISD – Official site.

School districts in Orange County, Texas
School districts in Jasper County, Texas